Eydis Konráðsdóttir (born February 16, 1978) is an Icelandic former swimmer, who specialized in sprint butterfly events. She represented Iceland in two editions of the Olympic Games (1996 and 2000), and also held an Icelandic record in the 100 m butterfly until it was later broken by Kolbrún Yr Kristjánsdóttir and Sarah Blake Bateman within the 2000s decade. Konradsdottir is a medicine undergraduate at the University of New South Wales, and also married to Australia's medley swimmer and three-time Olympian Matthew Dunn.

Konradsdottir made her first Icelandic team, as an eighteen-year-old junior, at the 1996 Summer Olympics in Atlanta, where she competed in the 100 m butterfly. Swimming in heat three, she picked up a fifth seat and twenty-ninth overall in 1:03.41.

At the 2000 Summer Olympics in Sydney, Konradsdottir competed again in the 100 m butterfly. She achieved a FINA B-cut of 1:02.93 from the Mare Nostrum Meet in Canet-en-Roussillon, France. She challenged seven other swimmers in heat three, including Thailand's three-time Olympian Praphalsai Minpraphal. She posted a seventh-place time of 1:03.27 in her own race to edge out Trinidad and Tobago's Siobhan Cropper by 0.07 seconds. Konradsdottir failed to advance into the semifinals, as she placed thirty-ninth overall on the first day of prelims.

References

1978 births
Living people
Eydis Konradsdottir
Eydis Konradsdottir
Swimmers at the 1996 Summer Olympics
Swimmers at the 2000 Summer Olympics
Eydis Konradsdottir